The Little Garlic River is a  tributary of Lake Superior in Marquette County on the Upper Peninsula of Michigan in the United States.

See also
List of rivers of Michigan

References

Michigan  Streamflow Data from the USGS

Rivers of Michigan
Rivers of Marquette County, Michigan
Tributaries of Lake Superior